Rauteli Bichawa  is a village development committee in Kanchanpur District in  Sudurpashchim Province of south-western Nepal. At the time of the 1991 Nepal census it had a population of 6718 people living in 1186 individual households.

References

Populated places in Kanchanpur District